Events from the year 1467 in Ireland.

Incumbent
Lord: Edward IV

Events
 The Lord Deputy is granted Lambay Island by statute to build a fortress for England's protection against the Spaniards, French and Scots.
 Events of this year are recorded in A Fragment of Irish Annals. The text is believed to date from the years 1467-68 or immediately after and covers only these two years.